Philip Caputo (born June 10, 1941) is an American author and journalist. He is best known for A Rumor of War (1977), a best-selling memoir of his experiences during the Vietnam War. Caputo has written 16 books, including two memoirs, five books of general nonfiction, and eight novels. His latest is the novel "Hunter's Moon" which was published in 2019 by Henry Holt.

Early life and career
Philip Caputo was born in Westchester, Illinois, a suburb of Chicago, and raised in Berwyn and Westchester. He attended Fenwick High School and Loyola University Chicago, graduating with a B.A. in English in 1964. From 1965–1966 Caputo served in the Republic of Vietnam (RVN) as an infantry lieutenant (platoon commander) in the United States Marine Corps. Caputo served in combat and earned several medals and awards upon completion of his tour of duty.

After serving three years in the Corps, Caputo began a career in journalism, joining the staff of the Chicago Tribune in 1968. In 1973, Caputo was part of a writing team that won the Pulitzer Prize for reporting on election fraud in Chicago. For the next five years, he was a foreign correspondent for the Tribune. He covered the fall of Saigon in 1975, and he worked in Italy, the Soviet Union and the Middle East. In 1975, he was shot and wounded in the ankle by a militiaman with an AK-47 during the Battle of the Hotels in Lebanon.

Books and articles
Philip Caputo's memoir of Vietnam, A Rumor of War (1977), has been published in 15 languages, and has sold two million copies since its first publication. It is widely regarded as a classic in the literature of war. The book was adapted as a 1980 two-part TV movie of the same name, starring Brad Davis, Keith Carradine, Brian Dennehy, and Michael O'Keefe. A Fortieth Anniversary Edition of A Rumor of War was scheduled for summer 2017.

In 2013 he published a travel/adventure memoir The Longest Road: Overland in Search of America From Key West to the Arctic Ocean. Some Rise By Sin (2017), his 16th book, is a novel about an American missionary priest struggling to save his Mexican parish from the ravages of a drug cartel.

In addition to books, Caputo has published dozens of major magazine articles, reviews, and op-ed pieces in publications ranging from The New York Times, The Boston Globe, and The Washington Post to Esquire, National Geographic, and the Virginia Quarterly Review.

Lecturing and television
Caputo has lectured at approximately 20 universities and prep schools around the country, and has been a featured speaker for the National Book Committee, the American Library Association, and the American Publishers Association. He has participated in the Key West Literary Seminar, Tennessee Williams Literary Festival, Chicago Humanities Festival, and the Cheltenham Literary Festival in Cheltenham, England.

He has also worked as a screenwriter for Paramount Pictures and Michael Douglas Productions. Caputo has been a guest on the Charlie Rose Show and the Today Show. He has narrated or appeared in several TV documentaries on the Vietnam War, the Cold War, and other subjects.

Bibliography

Fiction
 
 Delcorso's Gallery (1983)
 Indian Country (1987)
 Equation for Evil (1996)
 Exiles (1997)
 The Voyage (1999)
 Acts of Faith (2005) 
 Crossers (2009)
 Some Rise by Sin (2017) 
 Hunter's Moon (2019)

Non–fiction
 Ghosts of Tsavo (2002)
 In the Shadows of the Morning (2002)
 13 Seconds: A Look Back At the Kent State Shootings (2005) 
 Ten Thousand Days of Thunder (2005)
 
Memoir
 A Rumor of War (1977)  
 Means of Escape (1991)  
 The Longest Road (2013)

Filmography
A Rumor of War: Miniseries
The Vietnam War

References

External links
Philip Caputo official website, including article and book links, reviews, interviews, FAQs
Philip Caputo's papers at Howard Gotlieb Archival Research Center
Interview of Philip Caputo by Charlie Rose (2005)
Review of Crossers by William T. Vollmann
Interview on Acts of Faith at the Pritzker Military Library

with Philip Caputo by Stephen McKiernan, Binghamton University Libraries Center for the Study of the 1960s, December 12, 2009

1941 births
Living people
20th-century American non-fiction writers
20th-century American novelists
21st-century American non-fiction writers
21st-century American novelists
American male journalists
American male novelists
American memoirists
American military writers
American travel writers
The Atlantic (magazine) people
Loyola University Chicago alumni
People from Berwyn, Illinois
People from Westchester, Illinois
United States Marine Corps officers
United States Marine Corps personnel of the Vietnam War
20th-century American male writers
21st-century American male writers
Military personnel from Illinois